Derek Fernandes is the 6th current serving Roman Catholic Diocese of Belgaum.

Life 
He was born in Sirsi on 14 May 1954

Priesthood 
He was ordained a priest on 5 May 1979.

Episcopate 
On 24 February 2007, Pope Benedict XVI named Fernandes Bishop of Karwar, and he was consecrated as a bishop on 20 April 2007.
On 01 May 2019, Pope Francis appointed him as the 6th Bishop of Belgaum.

References

1954 births
21st-century Roman Catholic bishops in India
Living people

Bishops appointed by Pope Benedict XVI